Dorcatoma serra is a species of beetle in the family Ptinidae from Europe. It is often considered to be a synonym of Dorcatoma substriata.

This beetle has been noted feeding on the fungus Inonotus radiatus, which grows on several types of trees.

References

Ptinidae
Beetles of Europe
Beetles described in 1796
Taxa named by Georg Wolfgang Franz Panzer